Digital printing is a method of printing from a digital-based image directly to a variety of media. It usually refers to professional printing where small-run jobs from desktop publishing and other digital sources are printed using large-format and/or high-volume laser or inkjet printers.

Digital printing has a higher cost per page than more traditional offset printing methods, but this price is usually offset by avoiding the cost of all the technical steps required to make printing plates. It also allows for on-demand printing, short turnaround time, and even a modification of the image (variable data) used for each impression. The savings in labor and the ever-increasing capability of digital presses means that digital printing is reaching the point where it can match or supersede offset printing technology's ability to produce larger print runs of several thousand sheets at a low price.

Process 

The greatest difference between digital printing and analog methods, such as lithography, flexography, gravure, and letterpress, is that in digital printing (introduced in the 1980s) there is no need to replace printing plate, whereas in analog printing the plates are repeatedly replaced. This results in quicker turnaround time and lower cost in digital printing, but typically a loss of detail in most commercial digital printing processes. The most popular methods include inkjet and laser printers, which deposit pigment and toner, respectively, onto substrates, such as paper, canvas, glass, metal, and marble.

In many of the processes, the ink or toner does not permeate the substrate, as does conventional ink, but forms a thin layer on the surface that may be additionally adhered to the substrate by a fuser fluid with thermal (toner) or ultraviolet nocuring (ink).

Digital printing methods of note

Fine art inkjet printing 

Fine art digital inkjet printing is printing from a computer image file directly to an inkjet printer as a final output. It evolved from digital proofing technology from Kodak, 3M, and other major manufacturers, with artists and other printers trying to adapt these dedicated prepress proofing machines to fine-art printing. There was experimentation with many of these types of printers, the most notable being the IRIS printer, initially adapted to fine-art printing by programmer David Coons, and adopted for fine-art work by Graham Nash at his Nash Editions printing company in 1991. Initially, these printers were limited to glossy papers, but the IRIS Graphics printer allowed the use of a variety of papers that included traditional and non-traditional media. The IRIS printer was the standard for fine art digital printmaking for many years, and is still in use today, but has been superseded by large-format printers from other manufacturers such as Epson and HP that use fade-resistant, archival inks (pigment-based, as well as newer solvent-based inks), and archival substrates specifically designed for fine-art printing.

Substrates in fine art inkjet printmaking include traditional fine-art papers such as Rives BFK, Arches watercolor paper, treated and untreated canvas, experimental substrates (such as metal and plastic), and fabric.

For artists making reproductions of their original work, inkjet printing is more expensive on a per-print basis than the traditional four-color offset lithography, but with inkjet printing the artist does not have to pay for the expensive printing-plate setup or the marketing and storage needed for large four-color offset print runs. Inkjet reproductions can be printed and sold individually in accordance with demand. Inkjet printing has the added advantage of allowing artists to take total control of the production of their images, including the final color correction and the substrates being used, with some artists owning and operating their own printers.

Digital inkjet printing also allows for the output of digital art of all types as finished pieces or as an element in a further art piece. Experimental artists often add texture or other media to the surface of a final print, or use it as part of a mixed-media work. Many terms for the process have been used over the years, including "digigraph" and "giclée". Thousands of print shops and digital printmakers now offer services to painters, photographers, and digital artists around the world.

Notable digital laser exposure 
Digital images are exposed onto true, light sensitive photographic paper with lasers and processed in photographic developers and fixers. These prints are true photographs and have continuous tone in the image detail. The archival quality of the print is as high as the manufacturer's rating for any given photo paper used. In large format prints, the greatest advantage is that, since no lens is used, there is no vignetting or detail distortion in the corners of the image.

Digital printing technology has grown significantly over the past few years with substantial developments in quality and sheet sizes.

Digital cylinder printing 
Digital cylinder printing is when a machine directly lays ink onto a curved surface that usually is the wall of an object that has a circular cross section, and a constant, tapered, or variable diameter. Digital cylinder printing is a method of reproducing black-and-white or full-color images and text onto cylindrical objects, typically promotional products, through use of digital imaging systems.

The digital process is by definition faster than conventional screen printing, because it requires fewer production steps and less set-up time for multiple colors and more complex jobs. This in turn enables reduced run lengths.

The ability of digital cylinder printing machines to print full color in one pass, including primers, varnishes and specialty inks, enables multiple design techniques, which include:

 Mirror prints: viewable on the inside and outside of glass or plastic
 Tone on tone: solid matte-finished substrate enhanced with one ink or clear coat
 Stained glass: color opaque enough to see through
 Contouring
 Etched

Full-wrap cylindrical printing also benefits from seamless borders with no visual overlap. For ease of print file preparation, original design artwork should be able to be imaged on cylinders and tapered items without the need for manipulation or distortion; i.e., flat images will print to scale on a curved surface, with software automatically making the adjustment. The more advanced systems available on the market can handle these requirements.

The digital cylindrical printing process involves inserting a cylinder-shaped item, or part, into a fixture, which securely holds it in place. The part then travels under a print head mechanism in which tiny droplets of CMYK (cyan, magenta, yellow, and black) inks are released in a specific pattern to form an image. Typically, one part is printed at a time and can require from 8 to 45 seconds to complete, depending on artwork complexity and quality. It is then finished with a UV coating to add a glossy finish and protect it from abrasion.

There are three different imaging techniques used by digital cylinder printing machines: multi-pass, single pass, and helical printing.

Multi-Pass: Multi-pass printing is when the print heads or printed object move axially in steps down the part, like a flatbed printer. The move time is inefficient and can lead to stitching artifacts between moves.

Single Pass: Single pass involves using an array of print heads to print the full image length with a single revolution of the printed object. Different colors are usually printed at different stations, leading to higher cost, increased complexity, and sensitivity to print nozzle drop-outs.  

Helical Printing: Helical printing is a hybrid method between the single-pass and multi-pass approaches. Image data is mapped to allow continuous imaging in a helical pattern with a limited number of print heads. Users can optimize the print resolution, speed, and curing controls to optimize image quality or choose higher speed if quality isn’t critical. Tapers can be imaged at high speed and curved vessels can be managed through the range of controls offered.

Items that can be printed using digital cylindrical processes include cups, tumblers, thermos bottles, bottles, makeup containers, machine parts, carrier tubes, pens, tubes, jars and others.

Applications 
Digital printing has many advantages over traditional methods. Some applications of note include:
 Desktop publishing – inexpensive home and office printing is only possible because of digital processes that bypass the need for printing plates
 Commercial – Business Stationery - Including business cards, letterheads
 Variable data printing  – uses database-driven print files for the mass 
personalization of printed materials
 Fine art – archival digital printing methods include real photo paper exposure prints and giclée prints on watercolor paper using pigment based inks.
 Print on Demand  – digital printing is used for personalized printing for example, children's books customized with a child's name, photo books (such as wedding photo books), or any other books.
 Advertising – often used for outdoor vinyl banners and event signage, in trade shows, in the retail sector at point of sale or point of purchase, and in personalized direct mail campaigns.
 Photos  – digital printing has revolutionized photo printing in terms of the ability to retouch and color correct a photograph before printing.
 Architectural Design  – new media that conforms to a variety of surfaces has enabled interior and exterior spaces to be transformed using digitally printed wall murals and floor graphics.
 Sleeking – The process of adding foil, holographic effects or even glossy and dull finishes by way of digital ink adhesion. This is done by digitally printing a rich black area where the user wants the sleeking to take place. The machine registers this and only adheres to this specific area.

See also

 Color management
 Computer to film
 Computer to plate
 Digital ceramic printing on glass
 Digital embossing
 Digital image processing
 Digital photography
 Display device
 Flatbed digital printer
 Frescography
 Output device
 PODi
 Society for Imaging Science and Technology (IS&T)
 Tonejet
 Translight
 Weave (digital printing)

References

Digital press
Printing processes